Adderbury railway station served the village of Adderbury in Oxfordshire, England.

History 

The station was built by the Banbury and Cheltenham Direct Railway, which was taken over by the Great Western Railway before its opening.  When Britain's railways were nationalised in 1948 the B&CDR became part of the Western Region of British Railways, which then withdraw passenger services through Adderbury in 1951. Line through the station closed completely in 1969.

A housing estate has now been built on the station site and no trace of the railway remains.

Route

References

 
 
 
 Station on navigable O.S. map

Disused railway stations in Oxfordshire
Former Great Western Railway stations
Railway stations in Great Britain opened in 1887
Railway stations in Great Britain closed in 1951
1887 establishments in England
1951 disestablishments in England